The Doncaster railway line was a long-proposed suburban railway in the eastern suburbs of Melbourne, Victoria, Australia, that was anticipated to be built before December 2027, as a branch, along with the Hurstbridge line, of the planned future Clifton Hill Loop Line, as part of the 2013 PTV Network Development Plan.

The Doncaster line would have primarily served the suburbs of Bulleen, Balwyn North, Kew, Templestowe and Doncaster, running along the median strip of the Eastern Freeway for most of its length.

First proposed in 1890, detailed planning commenced in 1969, and by 1972 the route was decided upon. Despite rising costs, the state governments of the period continued to make assurances that the line would be built. Property acquisition for part of the route was completed in 1975, and construction of a cutting at the city end commenced in 1974, only to be filled in two years later. By 1982 plans to build the line were shelved by the state government, and by 1984 land for the line once it left the freeway was sold by the Cain Labor government. In 1991 an independent report investigated constructing the line, recommending against it due to the high cost. However several other reports released since the 1970s detail the essential requirement for heavy rail mass transit in the Doncaster corridor.

The Doncaster rail line plan is almost identical to the Joondalup line, completed in 1992, and the Mandurah line, completed in 2007, both in Perth, a city with less than half the population of Melbourne. The Mandurah line runs along the centre median of the Kwinana Freeway and through various tunnels. It is almost double the length of the proposed Doncaster line and cost 1.6 billion; trains are able to travel at up to 130 km/h.

In 2017, as part of the proposed North East Link road project, the median of the Eastern Freeway is set to be removed as part of an upgrade, with the addition of a new busway alongside the freeway. As a result, a rail line to Doncaster along the Eastern Freeway is unlikely to be built, barring a future conversion of the busway. However a train service through Doncaster has continued to be proposed as part of the northern section of the Suburban Rail Loop.

History

1890-1969: Early concepts

One of the earliest proposals for a railway to Doncaster was in 1890, and involved an extension of the Kew branch line in a tunnel under the High Street hill, then across the route of Outer Circle line to a terminus at Warrandyte, with a branch line running to Templestowe. In 1928 the Railways Standing Committee of the Victorian Parliament recommended a plan which also involved an extension of the Kew branch line, this time to terminate at Doncaster itself. That proposal was included in the Metropolitan Town Planning Commission's 1929 plan for Melbourne, together with the Glen Waverley railway line, which was subsequently constructed.

Concrete moves towards building the line were made in 1969, when The Age announced that the Victorian Railways had started detailed planning for a line which would run along the median of the Eastern Freeway and then on to Doncaster. The line featured in the 1969 Melbourne Transportation Plan, but no timeline for construction was set, whereas the building of the freeway was to start in the following year.

1969-1972: Work begins
In December 1971 the Eastern Railway Construction Act 1971 was passed by the state parliament, setting the route as along the Eastern Freeway to Thompsons Road, then through Templestowe to Blackburn Road, Doncaster, involving the demolition of 30 houses. However, this route was not without opposition, as in 1972 The Herald reported that the outer section of the line would be investigated by the Parliamentary Public Works Committee. The City of Box Hill rejected a plan put forward by the City of Doncaster & Templestowe as it would cut into open space along Koonung Creek, and Doncaster residents objected to a route running through the Eastern Golf Course to Blackburn Road. In December 1972 the parliamentary report was delivered and recommended the original route to be constructed as opposed to the 6 alternatives, and criticised the government for allowing development on the proposed routes. The outer section of the line was estimated to be $23.5 million, the total cost of the line being reported as $41 million. A terminus-to-city travel time of 20–25 minutes was expected.

The route decided upon was reported in The Age on 23 February 1972, but no completion date was mentioned:
Victoria Park station to Thompsons Road in the Eastern Freeway median strip.
Sub mile-long surface section along the Koonung Creek valley.
Surface level north east from the creek to the entrance of tunnel, located near the corner of Harold and Dale Streets, Bulleen.
 tunnel north-east under Manningham Road and High Street, Doncaster; to a point close to corner of Oak Crescent and Fyfe Drive, Doncaster.
 above ground running eastwards from the tunnel portal.
 above ground running east to Tuckers Road.
 above ground running to corner of Blackburn Road and King Street.

This plan is what the later included in the 1979 (Edition 12) Melway street directory, albeit with additional short lengths of tunnel at various places along the outer section of the route. It remained in the 1982 (Edition 14) Melway'.

1973-1990: Partial land sales and Government pull-out
In May 1973 the state Liberal Party pledged to build the line if elected, but only to Bulleen. They were returned to power at the state election. By December the same year the Parliamentary Public Works Committee had begun to re-examine the outer section of the line, considering three routes. The first costing $24 million would terminate at Bulleen, the second continued with a branch to Doncaster Road and cost $28 million, and the third was the original route but now costed at $63 million. By March 1974 the cost of the full line was reported by The Age to have increased to $73 million, and that none of the proposed routes could be considered on economic grounds, and a busway would be a better investment.

Despite doubts on the viability of the project, in July 1975 it was reported in The Sun that the Victorian Railways had purchased 18 properties for the railway. It was also reported in The Age that the government would still complete the railway, even though government sources put the cost up to $120 million, up from $74 million the year before. The proposed commencement date was after the completion of the underground City Loop in 1980.

Construction work on a cutting at the Victoria Park end of the line commenced in 1974 to allow the line to access the freeway median strip, but ceased in August 1975 due to economic difficulties faced by the contractor. By October 1976 the Herald'' reported that the '$600,000 cutting' had been filled in with excavated earth from elsewhere, the reason given by officials was that it needed to be filled so the freeway could be completed. The cost to rebuild the tunnel was estimated by the railways and  Country Roads Board at $1.5 million. The final nail in the coffin was a statement by Liberal shadow transport minister Rob Maclellan in August 1984, who said that the Cain Labor Government had sold the land set aside for the railway beyond the Eastern Freeway to Doncaster.

1991-2006: Continued support and alternatives
In July 1991 a report on transport in the Eastern Freeway corridor was presented to the Victorian transport minister Peter Spyker. Authored by Professor E.W. Russell, three options were examined in the report:
Heavy rail to Doncaster Shoppingtown, via Eastern Freeway to Bulleen Road then underground to terminus ($336 million)
Heavy rail to Blackburn Road and George Street, East Doncaster ($471 million)
Extension of North Balwyn (tram route 48) along Doncaster Road from Balwyn Road to Doncaster Shoppingtown ($6 million)

The longest of the plans involved 6 kilometres of tunnel, and seven stations, four of them underground. The report found that a heavy rail line would be "desirable but too expensive to consider unless major economies in tunnelling and station construction costs can be made". Public Transport Corporation estimates of the same period costed the two rail options at $376 million and $550 million respectively.

Despite the line being a recurring theme among public transport advocates and political hopefuls, today there is no firm commitment to build the line. The cost to complete the line today has been estimated at $1 billion, with transport in the region provided by private motor vehicles on the Eastern Freeway, and bus routes which operate along dedicated lanes from the Doncaster park and ride.

In 2003 the Northern Central City Corridor Strategy provided comparative costings for heavy rail, light rail and high quality bus services.

During the 2006 state election, the Victorian Liberal Party had done their own costing of the rail line and promised to extend the number 48 tram to Doncaster Hill, claiming that constructing the heavy rail line would cost around $1 billion and was deemed too expensive an option in the short term at least.

2007-present: Increased local council & public pressure

Following the state elections in 2006, public pressure mounted and local councils began to fully support the construction of the line, holding regular meetings, discussions and forums.

March 2008, Melbourne Transport Forum, a petition of 7,000 signatures for the Doncaster rail line was delivered by councillors to Minister for Transport Lynne Kosky.

The issue also spread into social websites too with numerous unofficial online groups and petitions being made

Mid-2008, Australian Greens Victoria released a transport discussion paper, The People Plan, which includes the Doncaster rail line.

Late 2008, at a forum investigating the Doncaster rail line, which involved the Yarra, Melbourne and Manningham city councils, it was noted that 41% of Manningham residents are classified as low-income earners (despite the eastern suburb affluence stereotype), this is higher than the city average. The discrepancy is suspected to be caused by the increased reliance on private automobiles to meet day to day transport requirements residents face due to the lack of alternative methods of transportation such as Tram-Trains. At this forum, Peter Newman noted the similarities between the Doncaster line and the Mandurah line and suggested that it was the only viable option for both the short and long term transportation needs of the area. Other recommendations included the creation of transport corridors to aid in the transition of the existing urban environment towards Transit oriented development.

In December 2008, in response to massive patronage increases on Melbourne's public transport system and increased road infrastructure problems, the State Labor Government released a transport plan which failed to deal with the construction of the Doncaster line. The proposal investigated the construction of a freeway through Greensborough, into Heidelberg and through the Yarra Flats to connect with the Eastern Freeway at a cost of $6 billion. The proposal is six times the cost of the Doncaster rail line and relies on the continued use of private automobiles.

Also in December 2008, residents in the Mullum Mullum ward in Manningham for the first time elected a former Green party candidate David Ellis, who has been campaigning against the construction of the proposed freeway through Manningham.

Mid 2009: As part of the development of the Victorian Transport Plan, the Labor government has pledged to create a Doncaster Area Rapid Transport (DART) system. However, unlike its DART and BART cousins in Dublin and San Francisco, this scheme is merely an increase in bus services in the Manningham area. Further online support from the community resulted, with a new, unofficial petition and information website.

Leading up to the 2010 election, which they subsequently won, the Victorian Liberal Party promised to commit $6.5m to complete another study to develop a route for building the railway line to Doncaster. Money was allocated for the study in the 2011 Budget.
 No funding source was nominated for the actual building of the line.

Routes 
The Doncaster Rail Study decided upon three key routes in the first phase of its study:
Rapid Transit: “Express to City” - the traditional route along the Eastern Freeway median strip (study team's preferred option)
Local Access: “Stopping all Stations” - through the City of Boroondara mostly underground to Doncaster
Orbital Network: “South to Box Hill” - a connection from Box Hill railway station; now being constructed as part of the Suburban Rail Loop

On the map below, the Rapid Transit theme is represented in blue, Local Access in green and the Orbital Network option in red. Orange nodes represent potential new stations and yellow lines are possible future extensions.

Recent costings
At the 2006 Victoria state election, the Labor Government costed the construction of the Doncaster rail line at around $1 billion. Other costings have been as high as $3 billion. In 2008, the Australian Greens Victoria released a transport discussion paper, The People Plan, which costed the construction of the line at $450 million. The Age newspaper quoted a 2012 report by transport experts from various Australian universities that suggested the line could be built for $840 million, being funded by the increase in property prices of the surrounding areas (although the report has not been made publicly available for review).

The Doncaster Rail Study Phase One Report given to the Victorian Government in February 2014 estimated the cost of a line from Clifton Hill to the Doncaster Park-And-Ride at between $3 - $5 billion with and extra $1 billion to extend the line to the Doncaster Activity Centre.  However the study found there was insufficient capacity between Clifton Hill and the city for trains from the new line so an extra $4 - $6 billion would be required to run the South Morang line from in a new tunnel to the city.

Capacity constraints and patronage sources
In 2012, the corridor from Clifton Hill to the city has a capacity of 22 trains per hour, with 17 trains per hour in the peak running, but it is predicted by 2021 the capacity can only be upgraded to 26 trains per hour and it is presumed 24 trains per hour will be used on the South Morang and Hurstbridge lines due to patronage increases and suburban growth, leaving only 2 trains per hour for Doncaster trains.

The Public Transport Users Association disputes this, arguing there is capacity for 6 Doncaster trains per hour, along with 11 Hurstbridge line and 7 South Morang (now Mernda) line trains along the Clifton Hill to city section of the track, with a capacity of 24 trains per hour (signalled for trains every 2 minutes and using 80% of this absolute maximum), and high capacity signalling allowing for up to 30 trains per hour. They also argue that peak time patronage is close to saturation, with more growth off peak

Average weekday patronage is predicted to be 56,000 boardings by 2031 with 98% of passengers coming from existing public transport, from sources such as the DART busses (Doncaster Area Rapid Transit) and the Ringwood line (shared section of the Belgrave and Lilydale lines).

See also
Doncaster busway
List of proposed Melbourne rail extensions
Mandurah railway line - a similar rail line built in Perth, 2004-2007.
East West Link

External Resources
GAMUT paper on the Doncaster Rail Line

References

Proposed railway lines in Australia
Public transport in Melbourne